Foratiana was an ancient Roman-Berber city in the province of Byzacena and Africa Proconsularis in the  Sahel region of Tunisia.

The civitas was also the seat of an ancient Christian diocese. It survives today as a titular see of the Roman Catholic Church, suffran to Carthage. Known Bishops include:
Bishop Bonifice
John William Comber 1959–1998
Alberto Bottari de Castello 1999–2007
José Elías Rauda Gutiérrez (El Salvador) 2008–2009
Bosco Puthur (India) 2010–2014
 Mar Bawai Soro 2014

References

 
Former populated places in Tunisia
Archaeological sites in Tunisia
Catholic titular sees in Africa
Roman towns and cities in Africa (Roman province)